Second Light or SecondLight may refer to:
 Second Light, a 1995 album by the British band Dreadzone
 SecondLight, a Microsoft technology that is similar to Microsoft PixelSense
 Second Light, a mission plan for the Kepler space telescope